Tiago Gomes may refer to:
Tiago Gomes (footballer, born 1986), Portuguese football defender
Tiago Gomes (footballer, born 1985), Portuguese football midfielder

See also
Thiago Gomes (disambiguation)